Never Forgotten is a 2011 picture book by Pat McKissack about a blacksmith father in West Africa who has Musafa, his son, kidnapped by  slavers and with the assistance of the four elements discovers that Musafa is working in Charleston as a blacksmith's apprentice.

Reception
School Library Journal, in a review of Never Forgotten,  wrote "As an author, Patricia McKissack has always had a knack for language. Her wordplay can be a delight to listen to .. or chill you to the core. Here, she does both at once." and concluded " Ms. McKissack is striding into new territory here. And while I might have tweaked that ending a bit, there’s no denying that as a visual and audible product, Never Forgotten it is difficult to find a match. .. A true, unadulterated, original."

The Horn Book Magazine found "The free-verse text can weigh heavily on the ear, but the Dillons' rousing illustrations -- at once bold, complex, and lucid -- impart dramatic conviction to the thwarted Fire and the slave-boat beyond reach, the pursuing Wind peering into the Carolina blacksmith's window."

Never Forgotten has also been reviewed by Publishers Weekly, and Kirkus Reviews

It was a 2012 Coretta Scott King Author Award honor book.

References

2011 children's books
American picture books
Books illustrated by Leo and Diane Dillon
American poetry collections
Slave narratives
Books by Patricia McKissack